Fifth Council of Constantinople is a name given to a series of six councils held in the Byzantine capital Constantinople between 1341 and 1351, to deal with a dispute concerning the mystical doctrine of Hesychasm. These are referred to also as the Hesychast councils or the Palamite councils, since they discussed the theology of Gregory Palamas, whom Barlaam of Seminara opposed in the first of the series, and others in the succeeding five councils.

The result of these councils is accepted as having the authority of an ecumenical council by some Eastern Orthodox Christians.

History
As it became clear that the dispute between Barlaam and Palamas was irreconcilable and would require the judgment of an episcopal council.  A series of six patriarchal councils was held in Constantinople on 10 June 1341, August 1341, 4 November 1344, 1 February 1347, 8 February 1347, and 28 May 1351  to consider the issues.

Barlaam's primary supporter Emperor Andronicus III died just five days after the synod ended.  Although Barlaam initially hoped for a second chance to present his case against Palamas, he soon realised the futility of pursuing his cause, and left for Calabria where he converted to the Roman Church and was appointed Bishop of Gerace.

After Barlaam's departure, Gregory Akindynos became the chief critic of Palamas.  A second council held in Constantinople in August 1341 condemned Akindynos and affirmed to findings of the earlier council.  Akindynos and his supporters gained a brief victory at the third synod held in 1344 which excommunicated Palamas and one of his disciples, Isidore Buchiras. 

In May 1351, a patriarchal council conclusively exonerated Palamas and condemned his opponents.  This synod ordered that the metropolitans of Ephesus and Ganos be defrocked and jailed.  All those who were unwilling to submit to the orthodox view were to be excommunicated and kept under surveillance at their residences.  A series of anathemas were pronounced against Barlaam, Akindynos and their followers; at the same time, a series of acclamations were also declared in favor of Gregory Palamas and the adherents of his doctrine.

See also
Hesychasm
Palamism
Fourth Council of Constantinople (Eastern Orthodox)

References

Further reading 

T. R. Valentine, "The Eighth and Ninth Ecumenical Councils"

Constantinople 5
1340s
Constantinople
1340s in the Byzantine Empire
1350s in the Byzantine Empire
Palamism
Hesychasm